The Robert Motherwell Book Award is an award granted annually by the Dedalus Foundation to the author of an outstanding book first published the year before in the history and criticism of modernism in the arts, including the visual arts, literature, music, and the performing arts. The award is named in honor of the founder of the Dedalus Foundation, American abstract expressionist painter Robert Motherwell, and comes with a $10,000 cash prize. Nominations are forwarded to the foundation by book publishers, and the winner is chosen by a panel of distinguished scholars and writers.

List of honorees

 2002 — Daniel Arasse, Anselm Kiefer
 2003 — Gerard Durozoi, History of the Surrealist Movement
 2004 — Roger Benjamin, Orientalist Aesthetics: Art, Colonialism, and French North Africa, 1880-1930
 2005 — Theodore Ziolkowski, Ovid and the Moderns
 2006 — Lawrence Rainey, Revisiting "The Waste Land"
 2007 — Jane Ashton Sharp, Russian Modernism between East and West: Natal'ia Goncharova and the Moscow Avant-Garde
 2008 — Aleksandra Shatskikh, Vitebsk: The Life of Art
 2009 — R. Bruce Elder, Harmony and Dissent: Film and Avant-Garde Art Movements in the Early Twentieth Century
 2010 — Susan Sidlauskas, Cézanne's Other: The Portraits of Hortense
 2011 — Matthew Jesse Jackson, The Experimental Group: Ilya Kabakov, Moscow Conceptualism, Soviet Avant-Gardes
 2012 — Anna Sigridur Arnar, The Book as Instrument: Stephane Mallarme, the Artist's Book, and the Transformation of Print Culture
 2013 — Jennifer Jane Marshall, Machine Art, 1934
 2014 — Michael North, Novelty: A History of the New
 2015 — Megan R. Luke, Kurt Schwitters: Space, Image, Exile
 2016 — Annie Bourneuf, Paul Klee: The Visible and the Legible
 2017 — Reiko Tomii, Radicalism in the Wilderness: International Contemporaneity and 1960s Art in Japan
 2018 — Julia Bryan-Wilson, Fray: Art and Textile Politics
 2019 — Fabiola López-Durán, Eugenics in the Garden: Transatlantic Architecture in the Crafting of Modernity.
 2020 — Suzanne Blier, Picasso’s Demoiselles: The Untold Origins of a Modern Masterpiece
 2021 — David Joselit, Heritage and Debt: Art in Globalization

References

American non-fiction literary awards